The following is a list of notable events and releases that musically occurred in 2009 in South Korea.

Notable events and achievements 
February 12 – At the annual Seoul Music Awards, Wonder Girls win the grand prize.
March 12 – Toy, Sister's Barbershop, and Kiha & The Faces win the grand prizes at the 6th Korean Music Awards.
March 13 – "Gee" by Girls' Generation tops the Music Bank chart for nine consecutive weeks, setting a new record.
March 28 – DFSB Kollective signs worldwide distribution deals with various South Korean music acts, including Epik High, Yoon Mi-rae and Drunken Tiger, bringing Korean music content to iTunes.
March – According to statistics from Google trends, online searches for K-pop began their steady increase in 2009, following the release of the hit songs Super Junior's "Sorry Sorry" and Girls' Generation's "Gee".
April 4 – BoA's self-titled debut English album becomes the first album by a Korean artist to appear on the Billboard 200, entering at number 127.
June 27 – Wonder Girls open for the Jonas Brothers on their 2009 World Tour during their North American leg.
July 20 – Wonder Girls make their American live television debut on The Wendy Williams Show, where they perform "Nobody".
August 5 – The choreography of "Mister" by Kara, featuring the "butt dance", spreads in popularity in South Korea.
October 12 – TVXQ become the first foreign artist in twenty years to peak at number one on the Japanese Oricon DVD ranking.
October 31 – "Nobody" (English version) by Wonder Girls becomes the first K-pop song to chart on the Billboard Hot 100, entering at number 76.
November 21 – The 2009 Mnet Asian Music Awards take place. 2NE1, 2PM, and G-Dragon win the grand prizes at the ceremony. 2NE1 becomes the first artist to win a grand prize in their debut year.
December 10 – At the 24th Golden Disc Awards, Super Junior and Girls' Generation receive the grand prizes.
December 16 – The inaugural Melon Music Awards are held in Seoul, with Girls' Generation and G-Dragon winning the grand prizes.
December 19 – According to the 2009 Oricon Annual Ranking, TVXQ becomes the third best-selling artist in Japan of the year, with ₩90.3 billion in sales.

Award shows and festivals

Award ceremonies

Festivals

Debuting and disbanded in 2009

Debuting groups

2NE1
4minute
After School
Apollo 18
Beast
Bye Bye Sea
December
f(x)
JQT
MBLAQ
Rainbow
Secret
SHU-I
Supreme Team
T-ara
Urban Zakapa

Solo debut

Ali
Brave Brothers
Dara
Dia
Gilme
G-Dragon
Hwang Jung-eum
Jo Eun-byul
Kim Yoon-ji
Kim Jeong-hoon
Lee Hyun
Park Bom
Seo In-guk
Taegoon

Disbanded groups
Baby Vox Re.V
Battle
Super Junior-M

Releases in 2009

First quarter

January

February

March

Second quarter

April

May

June

Third quarter

July

August

September

Fourth quarter

October

November

December

See also
2009 in South Korea
List of South Korean films of 2009

References

 
South Korean music
K-pop